Rhochmopterum venustum is a species of tephritid or fruit flies in the genus Rhochmopterum of the family Tephritidae.

Distribution
Japan, Thailand & Vietnam Southeast to New Guinea & Australia.

References

Tephritinae
Insects described in 1914
Diptera of Asia
Diptera of Australasia